Art and culture law is the body of law, including domestic and foreign law, and multilateral treaties and conventions, that regulates and is applied to artists, fine art and cultural property. Art can expose society's faults and freedoms and often artistic expression can conflict with cultural and political ideals. Yet equally, art can also make sense of law - advancing dialogues on social injustice.

Areas of art and culture law
 Art and cultural property law
 Art and cultural heritage law
 Berne Convention for the Protection of Literary and Artistic Works (1971)
 Copyright litigation
 Cultural property disputes
 Cultural property law
 Federal cultural property legislation
 International cultural property protection
 Moral rights

Theories 
John Henry Merryman is a pioneer of cultural and artistic property law academia. He has drawn distinctions between two paradigms through which art and cultural law can be defined. The first is the subject being independent of its national ties and attracting significance and meaning from the historical or archaeological interest that is generated by human culture. This is idea is legally bolstered by the UNESCO definition of cultural objects which is a close definition of significant objects which attract interest. The second inextricably ties cultural objects to their national heritage which in turn legitimises efforts for their re-patriation (see Elgin marbles, Gweagal shield, Easter island).

References

External links
 The Art Law Blog
 National Coalition Against Censorship Art Law Database
 Authentication in Art: Art & Law

 
Civil law (common law)
Intellectual property law
International law